Coleothorpa seminuda is a species of case bearing leaf beetle in the family Chrysomelidae. It has no subspecies. It is found in North America.

References

Clytrini
Beetles of North America
Beetles described in 1892